Into the Deep may refer to:

Into the Deep (album), a 2015 album by the band Galactic
Into the Deep (film), a 2020 Danish documentary about Peter Madsen and the murder of journalist Kim Wall
"Into the Deep" (Once Upon a Time), a 2012 second-season episode of the television series Once Upon a Time
Into the Deep: America, Whaling & the World, a 2010 documentary film